The Xiaomi Black Shark 4 is a line of Android-based gaming smartphones developed and manufactured by Xiaomi as part of its Black Shark product line. It is the successor to the Black Shark 3 line and was launched on March 23, 2021.

References 

Mobile phones introduced in 2021
Android (operating system) devices
Mobile phones with multiple rear cameras
Xiaomi smartphones
Mobile phones with 4K video recording